Sorbaria grandiflora is a species of flowering plant in the family Rosaceae, native to eastern Siberia and the Russian Far East. A perennial shrub reaching , it is hardy in USDA zones 5 through 7, and is considered useful in the garden as it flowers in July when other shrubs are not in bloom. Care must be taken lest it become invasive.

References

grandiflora
Flora of Siberia
Flora of the Russian Far East
Plants described in 1879